Virginia S. Hinshaw served as the Chancellor of the University of Hawai‘i at Mānoa, beginning in 2007 and ending in 2012. She is a scientist with expertise in microbiology, and serves as national co-chair of the Association of Public and Land-Grant Universities’ Energy Initiative Advisory Committee.

Hinshaw served as provost and executive vice chancellor at the University of California-Davis, and was the former dean of the graduate school and vice chancellor for research at the University of Wisconsin-Madison.

Hinshaw earned a BS in laboratory technology, and an MS and PhD in microbiology from Auburn University in Alabama.  Prior to becoming an administrator, her research focused mainly on influenza viruses and approaches to vaccines. Her work has been published in numerous journals including the Journal of Virology, Virology, and Intervirology

References

External links
 Centennial Celebration and Inauguration Ceremony for Virginia S. Hinshaw, PhD

American microbiologists
Auburn University alumni
Women microbiologists
University of Wisconsin–Madison faculty
University of California, Davis faculty
Leaders of the University of Hawaiʻi at Mānoa
Year of birth missing (living people)
Living people
Women heads of universities and colleges